Hoffos is a surname. Notable people with the surname include:

 Courtney Hoffos (born 1997), Canadian freestyle skier
 David Hoffos (born 1966), Canadian artist